KSAQ 102.3 FM is a radio station licensed to Charlotte, Texas.  The station broadcasts a country music format and is owned by Creative RF Venture Group LLC.

References

External links

SAQ
Country radio stations in the United States